1-Phenylethylamine is the organic compound with the formula C6H5CH(NH2)CH3. Classified as a primary amine, this colorless liquid is often used in chiral resolutions. Like benzylamine, it is relatively basic and forms stable ammonium salts and imines.

Preparation and optical resolution
1-Phenylethylamine may be prepared by the reductive amination of acetophenone:

The Leuckart reaction, using ammonium formate, is another method for this transformation.

-malic acid is used to resolve 1-Phenylethylamine, a versatile resolving agent in its own right. The dextrorotatory enantiomer crystallizes with the malate, leaving the levorotatory form in solution.

See also 
 2-Phenylethylamine

References 

Phenethylamines